Hemicrepidius amitinus is a species of click beetle belonging to the family Elateridae. It can be found in Austria and in Germany. It was taken to Austria by German traders when they were taking supplies by train.

References

Beetles described in 1896
amitinus